Denis Ivanovych Zubrytsky (  (1777, Zhovka district, Kingdom of Galicia and Lodomeria (now Lviv Raion, Lviv Oblast, Ukraine) – January 16, 1862, Lemberg), was the first Ukrainian historian in Galicia and a major early figure in the Galician Russophile movement.

Life

Denis Zubrytsky was born in 1777 into a family of Ukrainian nobles.  After graduating from Lviv's gymnazium in 1795 he worked as a civil servant.  In his youth he had been pro-Polish, and had even supported Napoleon's invasion of Austria-Hungary; in 1809 he served as a secretary to the pro-French Polish forces who occupied the city. Later in his life, Zubrytsky became very hostile to Polish interests and an ardent supporter of Russophilism.  Between 1829 and 1847, he held various positions within the Stauropegion Institute, an important cultural and historical institution in western Ukraine that served as a bastion of Russophilism.  In 1842, he became a corresponding member of the St. Petersburg Archeological Commission, and in 1855 he became a corresponding member of the Russian Academy of Sciences. In 1843, he was commissioned to organize the Lviv municipal archive.

Works and ideas

Zubrytsky was highly influenced by his friend, Mikhail Pogodin, and his idea that Ukrainians and Russian constituted one nation. During his time Austria and Russia were allies and Zubrytsky idealized Russian autocracy while also being loyal to Austria-Hungary.  He opposed the Polish nobility and the Polish domination of Galicia, while also objecting to the abolition of serfdom. Through Zubrytsky's efforts many Galicians, such as Yakiv Holovatsky, one of the members of the Ruthenian Triad, were converted to Russophilism.

Denis Zubrytsky published numerous historical works.  His most significant work, written in the Russian language, was the History of the Principality of Galicia-Volhynia, written in 1852 and 1855. He also published articles on Galician folk songs, histories of the Ruthenian people and church figures in medieval times, and other historical articles. According to a letter Zubtrytsky wrote to Mikhail Pogodin, the purpose of his historical research was to acquaint Galicians (western Ukrainians) with Russian history and with the Russian language.

Notes 

1777 births
1862 deaths
People from Lviv Oblast
19th-century Ukrainian historians
Historians of Ukraine
Ukrainian people in the Austrian Empire
Ukrainian nobility
Russophiles of Galicia